Todos or Todosak — was ancient Armenian architect of the 6th—7th centuries, who built a series of churches in Armenia and Georgia. Today, little is known about Todos' life.

Churches 
 Ateni Sioni Church
 Katoghike Tsiranavor Church of Avan — built in interval from 588 to 597
 Jvari (monastery) — may be built by Todos in interval from 605 to 642

References 

Armenian architects
7th-century Armenian people